Zygmunt Solorz-Żak (born Zygmunt Józef Krok, August 4, 1956 in Radom) is a Polish businessman. He is the second richest person in Poland and has repeatedly appeared on Forbes' ranking of the world's billionaires, with an estimated net worth around €5.77 billion. He ranked #688 on the Forbes 2016 with a net worth of US$2.5 billion.

Businesses 
Solorz-Żak launched the free-to-air commercial TV channel Polsat in 1992, broadcast through satellite, and obtained a national commercial television license in 1993. Since the middle of the 1990s, Polsat has remained one of Poland's biggest television stations. His key assets also include the pay TV platform Cyfrowy Polsat.

He holds controlling stakes in the pension fund PTE Polsat, small life insurer Polisa and retail bank Invest Bank. After winning control over the distressed Elektrim conglomerate, Solorz-Żak obtained operating control over the lignite power plant PAK, ranked among the three largest electricity producers in Poland. He has owned the Śląsk Wrocław football club since 2008 and the Polish mobile phone company Polkomtel since 2011.

References

1956 births
20th-century Polish businesspeople
21st-century Polish businesspeople
Living people
Businesspeople from Warsaw
Polish billionaires
Polish business executives
Polish chief executives
Polish company founders
Polish mass media owners
People from Radom